The economy of the Faroe Islands was the 166th largest in the world in 2014, having a nominal gross domestic product (GDP) of $2.613 billion per annum. GDP increased from DKK 8 billion in 1999, to 21 billion in 2019. The vast majority of Faroese exports, around 90%, consists of fishery products.

History
After the severe economic troubles of the early 1990s, brought on by a drop in the vital fish catch and poor management of the economy, the Faroe Islands have recently recovered, with unemployment down to 5% in mid-1998, and holding below 3% since 2006, one of the lowest rates in Europe.

Challenges and opportunities

High dependence on fishing (including salmon farming) means the Faroe Islands' economy remains vulnerable. The Faroese hope to broaden their economic base by building new fish-processing plants. The islands allow up to 25% foreign ownership of ocean industry decreasing gradually until 2032 when foreign ownership must end. Petroleum found close to the Faroese area gives hope for deposits in the immediate area, which may lay the basis for sustained economic prosperity.  Also important are the annual subsidy from Denmark, which amounted to about 3% of the GDP.

The Faroes have one of the lowest unemployment rates in Europe (1% in 2019), but this is not necessarily a sign of a recovering economy, as many young students move to Denmark and other countries once they are finished with high school. This leaves a largely middle-aged and elderly population that may lack the skills and knowledge to take IT positions in business and industry. Since 2000, new information technology and business projects have been fostered in the Faroe Islands to attract new investment. The result from these projects is not yet known but is hoped to bring a better market economy to the Faroe Islands. The population was around 52,000 by 2019.

General salaries increased from DKK 7 billion in 2013 to DKK 10 billion in 2019. In 2020, salmon exports were DKK 3.3 billion. Fishing industries occupied 1,441 people on land and 1,341 at sea.

Trade
In 2014 the Faroe Islands had a trade surplus of 401 million DKK, a figure that rose to 1.43 billion DKK in 2016.  As of 2016, the Faroe Islands mainly imported goods from Denmark (2,467 million DKK), Germany (877 million DKK), and Norway (610 million DKK). The country's top export destinations were Russia (1,907 million DKK), the United States (898 million DKK), the United Kingdom (851 million DKK),  and Denmark (697 million DKK). European Union countries constituted 72.9% of total Faroese imports, while the exports of the Faroe Islands were more equally distributed between European Union (44.4%) and non-European Union countries (55.6%). The vast majority of Faroese exports, around 90%, consists of fishery products. Russian countersanctions on food imports from Norway and the European Union, saw the Faroe Islands increase its fresh salmon exports to Russia. The Faroe Islands has a free trade agreement with Iceland since 2005.

Energy 

Oil consumption peaked at over 300,000 tonnes in 2020, of which 30% was for fishing vessels. In 2014 217,547 tonnes of oil products were consumed in the Faroe Islands. Of this 31.58% was consumed by fishing vessels, 14.73% was used by SEV for electricity production, 23.23% was consumed in air, sea or land transport, 9.6% was used in the industry, and the rest was used in public or private buildings.

The islands have 6 hydroelectric plants, 4 diesel plants and several wind power plants with a capacity factor above 40%. In 2014, a 12MW wind farm for DKK 180 million became operational near Torshavn and increased wind capacity from 6.6 to 18.6MW. It decreases oil consumption by 8,000 ton (approximately 4M€) per year. A 2.3MW 700 kWh lithium-ion battery became operational in 2016. Planners also consider converting the existing hydropower to pumped-storage hydroelectricity. Tidal power and Thermal energy storage solutions are also considered. The islands have a goal of 100% green electricity production by 2030.

In 2014 and 2017 50.8% of the electricity production of SEV in the Faroe Islands came from green energy like hydro and wind, while 49.2% was produced by the thermal power plants, which was 12.4% less than in 2013.
fossil fuel: 49.2%
hydro: 39.5%
wind: 11.3% (2014)
nuclear: 0%

Total annual production: 305.4 GWh (2014) of which the production of thermal, hydropower and wind power was:
Thermal: 150,2 GWh
Hydropower: 120,7 GWh
Wind: 34,5 GWh

The Faroe Islands have no electricity connections to other areas, and thus operate in island condition. Some islands are also not connected to the other islands, and must maintain their own electric system.

Other 

Agriculture - products:
milk, potatoes, vegetables; sheep; salmon, other fish

Currency:
1 Danish krone (DKr) = 100 ører

Exchange rates:
Danish kroner (DKr) per US$1 – 5.560 (2008), 7.336 (January 2000), 6.976 (1999), 6.701 (1998), 6.604 (1997), 5.799 (1996), 5.602 (1995)

Further reading
 www.FaroeseSeafood.com - Information site on fisheries and aquaculture in the Faroe Islands
 Apostle, Richard A. The Restructuration of the Faroese Economy The Significance of the Inner Periphery. Frederiksberg, Denmark: Samfundslitteratur, 2002. 
 Elkjær-Hansen, Niels. The Faroe Islands Scenery, Culture, and Economy. Copenhagen: Royal Danish Ministry of Foreign Affairs, 1959.
 Hagstova.fo, 2008 figures

References

External links
Faroese banknote series Information about Faroese banknotes

 
Faroe
+Faroe Islands